The Community Cooker (Kiswahili translation on "Jiko ya Jamii") is a stove designed to produce safe, clean, and cheap energy for cooking from rubbish.

History and development 

 1990: Jim Archer recognized the increasing environmental problem around Kenya
 2008: First Community Cooker prototype completed
 2010: Community Cooker passed emission test and reached EPA standard
 November 2010: Community Cooker Foundation established

News and recognition 

 Winner of the British Expertise International Awards 2011-12 Environmental Impact Award
 CNN covered Community Cooker turning rubbish into fuel in 2011
 Community Cooker was exhibited at the Smithsonian Cooper‐Hewitt National Design Museum "Design with the Other 90%: Cities" exhibition
 Gemini News Service conducted an in-depth report on Community Cooker in 2011

The Community Cooker in 2012-2014

February 2012 
The Community Cooker wins the WORLD DESIGN IMPACT PRIZE,
sponsored by the International Council of Societies of Industrial Design (ICSID)

July 26, 2012 
The Community Cooker is short-listed for the FT/CITI Urban Ingenuity award.

July 27, 2012 
Together with the University of Nairobi's Architecture Department, PLANNING represented Kenya in "Running Ahead: Vitalizing Urban Areas and Communities" during the London 2012 Olympics in East Thames, 29-35 West Ham Lane, Stratford.

September 2012 
Orders for two community cookers for Dadaab Refugee Camp from the United Nations

November 2012 
Shortlist for the ICON "Most Socially Responsible Design" award.

December 2012 
On December 5, in New York, the Community Cooker is adjudicated as the winner of the FT/Citi Urban Ingenuity: Ideas in Action Energy Award (with the Metropolitan Government of Tokyo in second place) and also, by a unanimous vote of the jury, the Community Cooker is given the Overall Global INGENUITY LEADER Award. On December 19, the Community Cooker is short-listed for the 2013 FT ArcelorMittal "Boldness in Business" Award in their Corporate Responsibility/Environment category. To be adjudicated in March 2013.

See also
 List of stoves

References

External links
 

Stoves